Diversion colitis is an inflammation of the colon which can occur as a complication of ileostomy or colostomy, where symptoms may occur between one month and three years following surgery. It also occurs frequently in a neovagina created by colovaginoplasty, with varying delay after the original procedure. Despite the presence of a variable degree of inflammation the most suggestive histological feature remains the prominent lymphoid aggregates.

Symptoms and signs
People may be asymptomatic but common symptoms are abdominal discomfort, anorectal pain, mucous discharge and rectal bleeding that develops from the inflamed mucosa of the distal, unused colon.

Diagnosis
Diagnosis is aided by knowing the full clinical history.

Treatment
In many milder cases after ileostomy or colostomy, diversion colitis is left untreated and disappears naturally. Possible pharmacologic treatments include short-chain fatty acid irrigation, steroid enemas and mesalazine. For surgical candidates, reanastomosis is a reversal procedure carried out to restore bowel continuity that effectively halts the symptoms of diversion colitis.

References 

Colitis
Diseases of intestines
Gastrointestinal tract disorders